Mark of the Vampire (also known as Vampires of Prague) is a 1935 American horror film, starring Lionel Barrymore, Elizabeth Allan, Bela Lugosi, Lionel Atwill, and Jean Hersholt, and directed by Tod Browning. It has been described as a talkie remake of Browning's silent London After Midnight (1927), though it does not credit the older film or its writers.

Plot
Sir Karell Borotyn (Holmes Herbert) is found murdered in his house, with two tiny pinpoint wounds on his neck. The attending doctor, Dr. Doskil (Donald Meek), and Sir Karell's friend Baron Otto von Zinden (Jean Hersholt) are convinced that he was killed by a vampire. They suspect Count Mora (Bela Lugosi) and his daughter Luna (Carroll Borland), while the Prague Police Inspector Neumann (Lionel Atwill) refuses to believe them.

Sir Karell's daughter Irena (Elizabeth Allan) is the Count's next target. Professor Zelen (Lionel Barrymore), an expert on vampires and the occult, arrives in order to prevent her death. After Irena is menaced by the vampires on several occasions, Zelen, Baron Otto, and Inspector Neumann descend into the ruined parts of the castle to hunt down the undead monsters and destroy them. When Zelen and Baron Otto find themselves alone, however, Zelen hypnotizes the Baron and asks him to relive the night of Sir Karell's murder. It is then revealed that the "vampires" are actually hired actors, and that the entire experience has been an elaborate charade concocted by Zelen in the hopes of tricking the real murderer—Baron Otto—into confessing to the crime. Acknowledging that the charade has failed to produce its intended results, Zelen, along with Irena and another actor who strongly resembles Sir Karell, compels the hypnotized Baron into re-enacting the murder, effectively proving his guilt. During the re-enactment, Baron Otto reveals his true motive: he wished to marry Irena, but her father would not allow it. He also reveals how he staged the murder to resemble a vampire attack.

With Baron Otto arrested, Irena explains the plot to her fiance, Fedor (Henry Wadsworth), who was not involved in the subterfuge and believed that the vampires were real. The film ends with the actors who played the vampires packing up their supplies, and "Count Mora" exclaiming, "This vampire business, it has given me a great idea for a new act! Luna, in the new act, I will be the vampire! Did you watch me? I gave all of me! I was greater than any REAL vampire!" which is met with general lack of enthusiasm by his fellow thespians.

Cast
Lionel Barrymore as Professor Zelen
Elizabeth Allan as Irena Borotyn
Bela Lugosi as Count Mora
Lionel Atwill as Inspector Neumann
Jean Hersholt as Baron Otto von Zinden
Henry Wadsworth as Fedor Vincente
Donald Meek as Dr. J. Doskil
Ivan F. Simpson as Jan
Carroll Borland as Luna
Leila Bennett as Maria
June Gittelson as Annie
Holmes Herbert as Sir Karell Borotyn
Michael Visaroff as Innkeeper
James Bradbury, Jr. as Third Vampire
Egon Brecher as Coroner
Jessie Ralph as Midwife (scenes deleted)

Production

Co-star Carroll Borland had worked with Lugosi before, in a touring stage version of Dracula; she answered the casting call for the younger vampire role without being aware Lugosi was associated with the film, and won the part after the producers were impressed with how closely her physical movements resembled Lugosi's. She did not mention that they had previously worked together.
Makeup artist Bill Tuttle would later recollect to author Richard Bojarski,

According to Borland, the ending of the film (which reveals the "vampires" to be actors hired to trick a murderer) was not revealed to the cast until the end of shooting; Browning felt that their performances would be negatively affected by knowing that they were not "real" vampires. She reports that an alternate ending-in which Professor Zelen receives a telegram from the hired actors revealing that they were unable to make their train (thus implying the vampires that the film depicts were real)-was considered but rejected by Browning. She further claims that both she and Lugosi were disappointed with the ending, and found the twist "absurd."

Different versions
 
Early reviews of the film list running times of closer to 80 minutes, strongly suggesting that the film was cut back to 60 minutes by MGM after the early previews. This had led to much speculation about what the deleted footage contained.

Several sources, including critic Mark Viera and TCM writer Jeff Stafford, have claimed that MGM cut out suggestions of incest between Count Mora (played by Lugosi) and his daughter Luna. Viera further claims that the original screenplay explained that Count Mora was condemned to eternity as a vampire for this crime and shot himself out of guilt (which explains the otherwise unaccountable spot of blood which appears on Lugosi's right temple during the film). This was an unacceptable topic according to the standards of the Production Code, and consequently cut from the film. While the subplot was cut, the blood spot on Count Mora's face remains in the finished film and is never explained.

Writer Gregory William Mank (who had access to the shooting script for his book Hollywood Cauldron) disputes these claims, asserting that the original cut was only 75 minutes (the reports of an 80+ minute run time being the result of a misprint) and that most of the cuts were either exposition or comedy. He further asserts that the alleged incest subplot was never in the shooting script and never filmed, though he acknowledges that it was likely hinted at in the original scenario for the film written by Guy Endore. This claim is backed up by Borland, who points out that the studio would never have allowed such content to be filmed. Lugosi biographer Arthur Lennig asserts that Endore did originally intend an incest backstory, but that it was removed by the studio before the shooting script was written, though he goes on to claim that a cut line of dialogue indicates that Count Mora shot himself after strangling his daughter.

In the commentary which accompanies the film on the Hollywood Legends of Horror boxed set released by Warner Home Video, genre historians Kim Newman and Steve Jones seem to concur with Mank, hypothesizing that primarily comedic material—possibly related to the maid character played by Leila Bennett—was cut.

Reception
Upon its initial release, reviews of the film were relatively positive; a New York Times review by Frank Nugent claimed the film would "catch the beholder's attention and hold it, through chills and thrills ..." The review finished, "Like most good ghost stories, it's a lot of fun, even though you don't believe a word of it." It received similar praise from The Los Angeles Times, The Hollywood Reporter, and Motion Picture Daily. The film earned a tidy profit of $54,000, though it drew some distinct criticism as well, most notably from Dr. William J. Robinson, who claimed in a letter to the New York Times that,

Modern evaluations of the film are more mixed, largely due to the ending, which reveals that the vampires were actors hired to help trap a murderer (the twist is very similar to Browning's previous London After Midnight, where Lon Chaney's vampire character is ultimately revealed to be a detective in disguise). While it was not unusual for 1920s films such as The Cat and the Canary or The Gorilla to end with a revelation that the supernatural threat was a fraud, 1930s films such as Dracula and The  Mummy presented the supernatural elements as real, making Mark of the Vampire something of a anachronism for its time (particularly since Browning and Lugosi were most known for Dracula just a few years earlier). Some viewers thought that the ending compromised the film; Bela Lugosi reportedly found the idea absurd. Some critics, including genre critics Kim Newman and Steve Jones, have suggested the film may be a satire of the conventions of the horror film, pointing to the broad performances by Barrymore and some of the supporting characters, as well as the film's twist ending.

See also
 Bela Lugosi filmography
 Lionel Barrymore filmography
 List of vampire films
 Vampire films

References

External links

 
 
 

1935 films
1935 horror films
American vampire films
American black-and-white films
Remakes of American films
Metro-Goldwyn-Mayer films
American detective films
Sound film remakes of silent films
Films directed by Tod Browning
Articles containing video clips
Gothic horror films
Films set in Prague
Horror film remakes
1930s American films